The following is a list of presidents of the United States by date of death, plus additional lists of presidential death related statistics. Of the 45 people who have served as President of the United States since the office came into existence in 1789, 39 have diedeight of them while in office.
 

Presidents in order of death

Notes

Died same day, date, year, age

Same day
 July 4, 1826: Thomas Jefferson at 12:30 p.m., and John Adams at 6:20 p.m.

Same date
 March 8: Millard Fillmore in 1874 and William Howard Taft in 1930 
 July 4: John Adams and Thomas Jefferson in 1826, and James Monroe in 1831
 December 26: Harry S. Truman in 1972 and Gerald Ford in 2006

Same calendar year
 1826: Thomas Jefferson and John Adams, both on July 4
 1862: John Tyler and Martin Van Buren, on January 18 and July 24 respectively
 1901: Benjamin Harrison and William McKinley, on March 13 and September 14 respectively

Same age (rounded down to nearest year)
 93: Gerald Ford and Ronald Reagan
 90: John Adams and Herbert Hoover
 78: Andrew Jackson and Dwight D. Eisenhower
 71: John Tyler and Grover Cleveland
 67: George Washington, Benjamin Harrison and Woodrow Wilson
 64: Franklin Pierce and Lyndon B. Johnson
 63: Ulysses S. Grant and Franklin D. Roosevelt
 60: Theodore Roosevelt and Calvin Coolidge
 57: Chester A. Arthur and Warren G. Harding

Died before multiple predecessors

9th president William Henry Harrison (died April 4, 1841)
  before 7th president Andrew Jackson (died June 8, 1845)
  before 6th president John Quincy Adams (died February 23, 1848)
  before 8th president Martin Van Buren (died July 24, 1862)
11th president James K. Polk (died June 15, 1849)
  before 10th president John Tyler (died January 18, 1862)
  before 8th president Martin Van Buren (died July 24, 1862)
12th president Zachary Taylor (died July 9, 1850)
  before 10th president John Tyler (died January 18, 1862)
  before 8th president Martin Van Buren (died July 24, 1862)
15th president James Buchanan (died June 1, 1868)
  before 14th president Franklin Pierce (died October 8, 1869)
  before 13th president Millard Fillmore (died March 8, 1874)
16th president Abraham Lincoln (died April 15, 1865)
  before 15th president James Buchanan (died June 1, 1868)
  before 14th president Franklin Pierce (died October 8, 1869)
  before 13th president Millard Fillmore (died March 8, 1874)
20th president James A. Garfield (died September 19, 1881)
  before 18th president Ulysses S. Grant (died July 23, 1885)
  before 19th president Rutherford B. Hayes (died January 17, 1893)
29th president Warren Harding (died August 2, 1923)
  before 28th president Woodrow Wilson (died February 3, 1924)
  before 27th president William Howard Taft (died March 8, 1930)
35th president John F. Kennedy (died November 22, 1963)
  before 31st president Herbert Hoover (died October 20, 1964)
  before 34th president Dwight D. Eisenhower (died March 28, 1969)
  before 33rd president Harry S. Truman (died December 26, 1972)
40th president Ronald Reagan (died June 5, 2004)
  before 38th president Gerald Ford (died December 26, 2006)
 Died before 39th president Jimmy Carter, who is still alive

Died after multiple successors

6th president John Quincy Adams (died February 23, 1848)
 after 9th president William Henry Harrison (died April 4, 1841)
 after 7th president Andrew Jackson (died June 8, 1845)
8th president Martin Van Buren (died July 24, 1862)
 after 9th president William Henry Harrison (died April 4, 1841)
 after 11th president James K. Polk (died June 15, 1849)
 after 12th president Zachary Taylor (died July 9, 1850)
 after 10th president John Tyler (died January 18, 1862)
10th president John Tyler (died January 18, 1862)
 after 11th president James K. Polk (died June 15, 1849)
 after 12th president Zachary Taylor (died July 9, 1850)
13th president Millard Fillmore (died March 8, 1874)
 after 16th president Abraham Lincoln (died April 15, 1865)
 after 15th president James Buchanan (died June 1, 1868)
 after 14th president Franklin Pierce (died October 8, 1869)
14th president Franklin Pierce (died October 8, 1869)
 after 16th president Abraham Lincoln (died April 15, 1865)
 after 15th president James Buchanan (died June 1, 1868)
19th president Rutherford B. Hayes (died January 17, 1893)
 after 20th president James A. Garfield (died September 19, 1881)
 after 21st president Chester A. Arthur (died November 18, 1886)
22nd & 24th president Grover Cleveland (died June 24, 1908)
 after 23rd president Benjamin Harrison (died March 13, 1901)
 after 25th president William McKinley (died September 14, 1901)
27th president William Howard Taft (died March 8, 1930)
 after 29th president Warren Harding (died August 2, 1923)
 after 28th president Woodrow Wilson (died February 3, 1924)
31st president Herbert Hoover (died October 20, 1964)
 after 32nd president Franklin D. Roosevelt (died April 12, 1945)
 after 35th president John F. Kennedy (died November 22, 1963)
33rd president Harry S. Truman (died December 26, 1972)
 after 35th president John F. Kennedy (died November 22, 1963)
 after 34th president Dwight D. Eisenhower (died March 28, 1969)

See also
 Curse of Tippecanoe 
 State funerals in the United States

References

External links
Presidential obituaries

Death by date

Presidents by date of death